Joseph A. Sullivan (August 9, 1911 – March 15, 2002) was a former Democratic member of the Pennsylvania House of Representatives.

References

Democratic Party members of the Pennsylvania House of Representatives
1911 births
2002 deaths
20th-century American politicians